Tequintavirus (synonyms T5-like phages, T5-like viruses, T5likevirus) is a genus of viruses in the order Caudovirales, in the family Demerecviridae. Bacteria serve as the natural host, with transmission achieved through passive diffusion. There are currently 22 species in this genus, including the type species Escherichia virus T5.

Taxonomy
The following species are recognized:

 Escherichia virus AKFV33
 Escherichia virus BF23
 Escherichia virus chee24
 Escherichia virus DT5712
 Escherichia virus DT57C
 Escherichia virus FFH1
 Escherichia virus Gostya9
 Escherichia virus H8
 Escherichia virus mar004NP2
 Escherichia virus OSYSP
 Escherichia virus phiAPCEc03
 Escherichia virus phiLLS
 Escherichia virus slur09
 Escherichia virus T5
 Salmonella virus NR01
 Salmonella virus S131
 Salmonella virus Shivani
 Salmonella virus SP01
 Salmonella virus SP3
 Salmonella virus SPC35
 Shigella virus SHSML45
 Shigella virus SSP1

Structure
Tequintaviruses are nonenveloped, with a head and tail. The head is icosahedral (T=13) and is about 90 nm in diameter. The tail is about 180 nm long, 9 nm wide. It has three long, kinked terminal fibers around 120 nm in length, and a single straight central fiber attached to a conical tip.

Genome
Genomes are linear, around 121kb in length. The type species, Enterobacteria phage T5, and several other species have been fully sequenced. The genomes range between roughly 108-121 thousand nucleotides, with about 140 to 170 predicted open reading frames. The complete genomes, as well as two other similar, unclassified genomes are available here.

Life cycle
The virus attaches to the host cell's adhesion receptors using its terminal fibers, and degrades the cell wall using viral exolysin enough to eject the viral DNA into the host cytoplasm via long flexible tail ejection system. Replication follows the DNA strand displacement, via replicative transposition model. DNA-templated transcription is the method of transcription. Once the viral genes have been replicated, the procapsid is assembled and packed. The tail is then assembled and the mature virions are released via lysis. Bacteria serve as the natural host. Transmission routes are passive diffusion.

History
According to ICTV's 1996 report, the genus T5likevirus was first accepted under the name T5-like phages, assigned only to family Siphoviridae. The whole family was moved to order Caudovirales in 1998, and the genus was renamed to T5-like viruses in ICTV's 7th Report in 1999. In 2012, it was renamed again to T5likevirus. The genus was later renamed to Tequintavirus and placed in the newly established family Demerecviridae.

References

External links
 Viralzone: T5likevirus
 ICTV

Caudovirales
Virus genera